Takako Katō may refer to:

 Takako Katō (actress) (born 1970), Japanese actress and singer
 Takako Katō (basketball) (born 1971), Japanese basketball player